Linping is a station on Line 9 of the Hangzhou Metro in China. It was opened in November 2012. It is located in the Linping District of Hangzhou.

References

Railway stations in Zhejiang
Railway stations in China opened in 2012
Hangzhou Metro stations